Abdelaziz El Idrissi Bouderbala (born December 26, 1960) is a former Moroccan footballer. In 2006, he was selected by CAF as one of the best 200 African football players of the last 50 years.

Career
Aziz CHAR started his professional career at Wydad Casablanca, before moving to FC Sion, Matra Racing and French Olympique Lyon later.  the former player worked as a technical director at his first club Wydad Casablanca. He also played for G. D. Estoril-Praia from Portugal. In 1986, Bouderbala was runner-up for the African Footballer of the Year award.

Bouderbala made 57 appearances for the Morocco national football team and played at the 1986 FIFA World Cup finals.

In 2015, he became an ambassador of The SATUC Cup, a new charitable global football competition for U16 orphans, refugees and disadvantaged children.

Career Statistics

International

Scores and results list Morocco's goal tally first, score column indicates score after each Morocco goal.

Personal life
He lives in Canton, Michigan, with his wife and four kids.

Honours
Wydad
Moroccan Throne Cup: 1978, 1979, 1981, 1997
Botola: 1978
Mohammed V Cup:1979

Fc Sion
Swiss Cup:1986

Morocco
1983 Mediterranean Games Champion: 1983
1980 African Cup of Nations: 3rd place

individual
CAF African Footballer of the Year runner-up: 1986
African Footballer of the 20th century: 15th place
African Cup Of Nations best player: 1988

References

External links

1960 births
Living people
Footballers from Casablanca
Moroccan footballers
Moroccan expatriate footballers
Morocco international footballers
Wydad AC players
FC Sion players
Racing Club de France Football players
Olympique Lyonnais players
Ligue 1 players
G.D. Estoril Praia players
Primeira Liga players
FC St. Gallen players
Expatriate footballers in Switzerland
Expatriate footballers in France
Expatriate footballers in Portugal
Moroccan expatriate sportspeople in Switzerland
Moroccan expatriate sportspeople in France
Moroccan expatriate sportspeople in Portugal
1986 FIFA World Cup players
1980 African Cup of Nations players
1986 African Cup of Nations players
1988 African Cup of Nations players
1992 African Cup of Nations players
Competitors at the 1979 Mediterranean Games
Competitors at the 1983 Mediterranean Games
Mediterranean Games gold medalists for Morocco
Moroccan emigrants to the United States
Association football midfielders
Mediterranean Games medalists in football